The 2004 Jacksonville State Gamecocks football team represented Jacksonville State University as a member of the Ohio Valley Conference (OVC) during the 2004 NCAA Division I-AA football season. Led by Fifth-year head coach Jack Crowe, the Gamecocks compiled an overall record of 9–2 with a mark of 7–1 in conference play, winning the OVC title for the second year in a row. Jacksonville State made the NCAA Division I-AA Football Championship playoffs for the second straight year as well. Jacksonville State played home games at Paul Snow Stadium in Jacksonville, Alabama.

Schedule

References

Jacksonville State
Jacksonville State Gamecocks football seasons
Ohio Valley Conference football champion seasons
Jacksonville State Gamecocks football